The Detroit Century Box is a time capsule that was created in the U.S. city of Detroit, Michigan on December 31, 1900. Mayor William C. Maybury organized the capsule which consists of a copper box filled with photos and letters containing the then current state of affairs in Detroit along with predictions for the future. Mayor Dennis Archer presided over the opening of the capsule on December 31, 2000.

Detroit in 1900

Predictions for the future

Notable letter writers

Annie M. Knott
Charles Lang Freer
Clarence M. Burton
D. Augustus Straker
Frederick K. Stearns
James E. Scripps
John M. Donaldson
John Samuel Foley
William C. Maybury
William E. Quinby

See also

List of time capsules

References

External links
1901 Time Capsule contents Detroit Historical Society

Time capsules
History of Detroit